Sun Sun Win (born 13 November 1956) is a Burmese dental professor who currently serves as Rector of the University of Dental Medicine, Mandalay since 2015.

Early life and education
Sun Sun Win was born in Yangon, Myanmar on 13 November 1956. She graduated from University of Dental Medicine, Yangon in July, 1983. She received M.D.Sc in 1993 and Dr.D.Sc in 2013.

See also
 Myanmar Dental Association
 Myanmar Dental Council

References

Burmese dental professors
1956 births
Living people